Otto Rachals was Mayor of Green Bay, Wisconsin, from 1955 to 1959.

Biography
Rachals was born on January 1, 1897, in Langlade County, Wisconsin. In 1925 he married Gertrude Moore. He died on July 7, 1984, in Green Bay.

References

People from Langlade County, Wisconsin
Mayors of Green Bay, Wisconsin
1897 births
1984 deaths
20th-century American politicians